Pasquale de Luca (surname also spelled DeLuca) (born May 26, 1962 in Edmonton, Alberta) is a former Canadian professional soccer player. He is the head coach of the Edmonton Drillers.

Club career
A native of Edmonton, De Luca played four seasons in the North American Soccer League. He played 1981 and part of 1982 with his hometown Edmonton Drillers. He then played the remainder of 1982 as well as 1983 and 1984 for the Toronto Blizzard. De Luca later played in the original MISL, playing three seasons – 1985–86 through 1987–88 – with the Cleveland Force as a defender. In 1986, he also played for the Edmonton Brick Men in the Western Soccer Alliance.

International career
A forward for Canada, De Luca was a member of the 1984 Olympic team that reached the quarterfinals, going out on penalty kicks to Brazil's 'B' team after a 1–1 draw. de Luca did not however make any appearances either in qualifying or in the tournament finals. He played in 19 full internationals for Canada from 1984 to 1985, scoring one goal. His final international appearance came in the September 1985 match versus Honduras that clinched a berth in the 1986 World Cup. 

De Luca was on the 1986 World Cup squad, but did not appear in the finals.

International goals
Scores and results list Canada's goal tally first.

Honors
Edmonton Drillers
NASL indoor champion: 1980–81
NASL indoor season prmiership: 1981–82

Toronto Blizzard
NASL: 1983 (finalist)
NASL: 1984 (finalist)

References

External links

FIFA Pasquale de Luca
NASL/MISL/CSL stats

1962 births
Living people
Footballers at the 1984 Summer Olympics
1986 FIFA World Cup players
Association football defenders
Association football midfielders
Association football utility players
Canada men's international soccer players
Canadian expatriate sportspeople in the United States
Canadian expatriate soccer players
Canadian people of Italian descent
Canadian soccer players
Canadian Soccer League (1987–1992) players
Cleveland Force (original MISL) players
CONCACAF Championship-winning players
Edmonton Brick Men players
Edmonton Drillers (1979–1982) players
Expatriate soccer players in the United States
Major Indoor Soccer League (1978–1992) players
North American Soccer League (1968–1984) players
North American Soccer League (1968–1984) indoor players
Olympic soccer players of Canada
Soccer players from Edmonton
Toronto Blizzard (1971–1984) players
Western Soccer Alliance players